Harry Clifford "Blond Beast" Baujan (May 24, 1894 – December 30, 1976) was an American football player, coach of football and basketball, and college athletics administrator.  He served as the head football coach at the University of Dayton from 1923 to 1946, compiling a record of 124–64–8.  Baujan was also head coach of Dayton Flyers men's basketball team between 1923 and 1928, and later served as the school's athletic director.

Baujan played college football as an end at the University of Notre Dame.  He also played two seasons (1920–1921) in the National Football League for the Cleveland Tigers/Indians.  Baujan was posthumously inducted into the College Football Hall of Fame as a coach in 1990.

Baujan Field, the current home of the University of Dayton's men's and women's soccer teams, was named in Baujan's honor in 1961. The field served as the university's home football field since its construction in 1925, but has since been repurposed, undergoing several improvements.

Head coaching record

Football

References

External links
 
 
 

1894 births
1976 deaths
American football ends
Cleveland Tigers (NFL) players
Cleveland Indians (NFL) players
Dayton Flyers athletic directors
Dayton Flyers baseball coaches
Dayton Flyers football coaches
Dayton Flyers men's basketball coaches
Notre Dame Fighting Irish football players
College Football Hall of Fame inductees
People from Beardstown, Illinois
Coaches of American football from Illinois
Players of American football from Illinois
Basketball coaches from Illinois